The 1982 Individual Speedway Junior European Championship was the sixth edition of the European Under-21 Championships.

European final
July 18, 1982
 Pocking, Rottalstadion

References

1982
European Individual U-21
Speedway competitions in Germany
1982 in German motorsport